Santos Hernández Calvo (born 4 January 1967 in Madrid) is a Spanish former cyclist. He rode in 5 editions of the Vuelta a España and 3 editions of the Giro d'Italia.

Major results
1987
1st Overall Vuelta a la Comunidad de Madrid
1989
1st Prologue Vuelta a Aragón
2nd Subida a Urkiola
1990
2nd Vuelta a Murcia
1993
5th Züri-Metzgete
1994
1st Stage 3 Vuelta a los Valles Mineros

References

External links

1967 births
Living people
Spanish male cyclists
Cyclists from Madrid